Earl Antoine Boykins (born June 2, 1976) is a former American professional basketball player. He was the head coach for the Douglas County High School boys varsity basketball team. He is now serving as an assistant coach for the University of Texas at El Paso (UTEP) Miners.

Early life
Boykins was born in Cleveland, Ohio in 1976. As a child his 5' 8" father, Willie Williams, would sneak Boykins into a gym in his gym bag. Boykins grew up playing in recreational leagues with his father and other grown men. Boykins played high school basketball at Cleveland Central Catholic High School where he averaged 24.6 points per game and led the school to a 23–2 record as a senior. In 2015, The Plain Dealer ranked him the best Cleveland-area high school basketball player of the 1990s. Eastern Michigan and Iowa were the only two Division I basketball programs to offer Boykins an athletic scholarship, though Iowa later withdrew its offer.

College
Boykins played college basketball at Eastern Michigan University from 1994 to 1998. Eastern Michigan won the MAC tournament in 1996 and 1998. He earned All-Mid-American Conference first-team honors in his junior and senior year. Also, during his senior season, Boykins was second in the NCAA Men's Division I Basketball Championship in scoring, with an average of 26.8 points per game. He holds the career record for total assists (624) at Eastern Michigan University. In his last game he scored 18 points in a losing effort to Michigan State. On February 27, 2011, Boykins' No. 11 jersey was retired and raised to the rafters in a ceremony at Eastern Michigan University's Convocation Center.

Pro career

First NBA Stint
Boykins was never drafted by an NBA team, but he was signed to short-term contracts by five different NBA teams before signing a five-year, $13.7 million contract with the Denver Nuggets prior to the 2003–2004 season. On November 11, 2004, Boykins scored 32 points in a 117–109 Nuggets' home win over the Detroit Pistons, making him the shortest player in NBA history to score 30 or more points during a game. After spending three full seasons and a portion of a fourth season with Denver, Boykins was traded to the Milwaukee Bucks in January 2007. After finishing the season in Milwaukee, Boykins opted out of his contract; he later signed with the Charlotte Bobcats partway through the 2007–2008 season and finished the season there.

Italy
Following the 2007–08 NBA season, Boykins was an unrestricted free agent.  Instead of signing with an NBA team, he decided to play basketball in Europe and signed a one-year, $3.5 million net income contract with Virtus Bologna of the Italian A League.  The one-year deal made Boykins the highest-paid basketball player in the Italian League and included income from Bologna's sponsorship and marketing arms, which is not an option for NBA players because of salary-cap restrictions.

On December 26, 2008, it was announced by Virtus owner Claudio Sabatini that Boykins was cut from the club due to behavioral issues after Boykins flew home to the United States in order to see his sick son. However, a few days later, thanks to the intervention of Virtus general manager Andrea Luchi, it was announced that Boykins was staying with the club. On April 26, 2009, his team won the EuroChallenge Cup by defeating Cholet Basket. In June 2009, he was released by Virtus.

Return to NBA

Boykins signed with the Washington Wizards in November 2009, making his return to the National Basketball Association.  Boykins was a much-needed addition to the Wizards, after guards Gilbert Arenas and Javaris Crittenton were suspended for the remainder of the current season after a misdemeanor gun possession charge stemming from a locker room incident.  In the December 2, 2009, game against the Milwaukee Bucks, Boykins sank two free throws to clinch the Wizards' victory.

On August 19, 2010, the Bucks signed him to a one-year deal. Boykins signed a 10-day contract with the Houston Rockets on March 26, 2012. Boykins has not played in the NBA since.

The Basketball Tournament (TBT)
In the summer of 2017, Boykins competed in The Basketball Tournament on ESPN for Paul Champions. Competing for the $2 million grand prize, Boykins helped lead his team to two victories in the TBT Jamboree which secured Paul Champions' spot as one of the 64 teams in the tournament.  During the Jamboree, Boykins averaged 24.5 points, 4.0 assists and 3.5 rebounds per game.  In their first-round match up, Boykins scored a game-high 25 points, helping the Champions to a 78–74 victory over the Talladega Knights; a team led by former NBA players Josh Boone and Gary Forbes.  Boykins and the Champions would eventually fall in the second-round to the number one seeded Untouchables.

Career statistics

Regular season

|-
| style="text-align:left;"| 
| style="text-align:left;"| New Jersey
| 5 || 0 || 10.2 || .476 || .200 || .000 || .8 || 1.2 || .2 || .0 || 4.2
|-
| style="text-align:left;"| 
| style="text-align:left;"| Cleveland
| 17 || 0 || 10.0 || .345 || .154 || .667 || .8 || 1.6 || .3 || .0 || 2.6
|-
| style="text-align:left;"| 
| style="text-align:left;"| Orlando
| 1 || 0 || 8.0 || .750 || .000 || .000 || 1.0 || 3.0 || .0 || .0 || 6.0
|-
| style="text-align:left;"| 
| style="text-align:left;"| Cleveland
| 25 || 0 || 10.1 || .473 || .400 || .783 || 1.0 || 1.8 || .5 || .0 || 5.3
|-
| style="text-align:left;"| 
| style="text-align:left;"| L.A. Clippers
| 10 || 0 || 14.9 || .397 || .125 || .824 || 1.1 || 3.2 || .5 || .0 || 6.5
|-
| style="text-align:left;"| 
| style="text-align:left;"| L.A. Clippers
| 68 || 2 || 11.2 || .400 || .310 || .770 || .8 || 2.1 || .3 || .0 || 4.1
|-
| style="text-align:left;"| 
| style="text-align:left;"| Golden State
| 68 || 0 || 19.4 || .429 || .377 || .865 || 1.3 || 3.3 || .6 || .1 || 8.8
|-
| style="text-align:left;"| 
| style="text-align:left;"| Denver
| 82 || 3 || 22.5 || .419 || .322 || .877 || 1.7 || 3.6 || .6 || .0 || 10.2
|-
| style="text-align:left;"| 
| style="text-align:left;"| Denver
| 82 || 5 || 26.4 || .413 || .337 || .921 || 1.7 || 4.5 || 1.0 || .1 || 12.4
|-
| style="text-align:left;"| 
| style="text-align:left;"| Denver
| 60 || 0 || 25.7 || .410 || .346 || .874 || 1.4 || 3.8 || .8 || .1 || 12.6
|-
| style="text-align:left;"| 
| style="text-align:left;"| Denver
| 31 || 4 || 28.3 || .413 || .373 || .908 || 2.0 || 4.3 || .8 || .1 || 15.2
|-
| style="text-align:left;"| 
| style="text-align:left;"| Milwaukee
| 35 || 19 || 33.0 || .427 || .419 || .886 || 2.2 || 4.5 || .9 || .0 || 14.0
|-
| style="text-align:left;"| 
| style="text-align:left;"| Charlotte
| 36 || 0 || 16.0 || .355 || .318 || .831 || .9 || 2.7 || .4 || .0 || 5.1
|-
| style="text-align:left;"| 
| style="text-align:left;"| Washington
| 67 || 1 || 16.7 || .427 || .317 || .865 || 1.1 || 2.6 || .4 || .0 || 6.6
|-
| style="text-align:left;"| 
| style="text-align:left;"| Milwaukee
| 57 || 0 || 15.1 || .443 || .380 || .841 || 1.0 || 2.5 || .7 || .1 || 7.2
|-
| style="text-align:left;"| 
| style="text-align:left;"| Houston
| 8 || 0 || 13.9 || .333 || .222 || .867 || 1.4 || 2.1 || .1 || .0 || 4.9
|-
| style="text-align:center;" colspan="2"| Career
| 652 || 34 || 19.9 || .417 || .348 || .876 || 1.3 || 3.2 || .6 || .1 || 8.9

Playoffs

|-
| style="text-align:left;"| 2004
| style="text-align:left;"| Denver
| 5 || 0 || 24.2 || .444 || .357 || .857 || 2.4 || 3.8 || 1.0 || .2 || 13.4
|-
| style="text-align:left;"| 2005
| style="text-align:left;"| Denver
| 5 || 1 || 30.4 || .397 || .000 || .895 || 1.0 || 3.8 || .8 || .2 || 14.2
|-
| style="text-align:left;"| 2006
| style="text-align:left;"| Denver
| 5 || 0 || 28.0 || .322 || .211 || .795 || 1.4 || 4.0 || .8 || .0 || 11.0
|-
| style="text-align:center;" colspan="2"| Career
| 15 || 1 || 27.5 || .389 || .225 || .837 || 1.6 || 3.9 || .9 || .1 || 12.9

Coaching career
In 2014, Boykins was hired as the head coach of the Douglas County High School boys varsity team in Castle Rock, Colorado.

In 2021, Boykins was hired as an assistant coach with the UTEP Miners.

See also
List of shortest players in National Basketball Association history

References

External links
NBA.com Player Profile
Italian A League Player Profile
My Life as a Little Man at SportsIllustrated.com
Stats at Basketball-Reference.com

1976 births
Living people
20th-century African-American sportspeople
21st-century African-American sportspeople
African-American basketball players
American expatriate basketball people in Italy
American men's basketball players
Basketball players from Cleveland
Charlotte Bobcats players
Cleveland Cavaliers players
Denver Nuggets players
Eastern Michigan Eagles men's basketball players
Golden State Warriors players
High school basketball coaches in Colorado
Houston Rockets players
Los Angeles Clippers players
Medalists at the 1997 Summer Universiade
Milwaukee Bucks players
New Jersey Nets players
Orlando Magic players
Point guards
Rockford Lightning players
Undrafted National Basketball Association players
Universiade gold medalists for the United States
Universiade medalists in basketball
UTEP Miners men's basketball coaches
Virtus Bologna players